Anti-Terrorist Operation Zone, or ATO zone, is a term used by the media, publicity, the government of Ukraine, and the OSCE and other foreign institutions to identify Ukrainian territory of the Donetsk and Luhansk regions (oblasts) under the control of Russian military forces and pro-Russian separatists. A significant part of ATO zone is considered temporarily occupied territory of Ukraine.

History
On 20 February 2018, Ukrainian President Petro Poroshenko changed the status of the ATO zone from an anti-terrorist operation to "taking measures to ensure national security and defense, and repulsing and deterring the armed aggression of the Russian Federation in Donetsk and Luhansk oblasts". 

This allows the Ukrainian military to take charge of the zones instead of the Ukrainian secret service SBU. As such, the ATO was renamed to JFO zone (Joint Forces Operation.

Military administrative division
The official borders of the ATO zone were defined with a list of localities and their geographical coordinates, approved in November 2014 by Ukraine's parliament, the Verkhovna Rada.

The zone is conditionally divided into five sectors A, B, C, D, and M.
 Sector A – eastern and central parts of Luhansk Oblast
 Sector B – central parts of Donetsk Oblast including Donetsk and Makiivka
 Sector C – northern parts of Donetsk Oblast (cities Bakhmut and Debaltseve), and western parts of Luhansk Oblast
 Sector D – southern parts of Luhansk Oblast and eastern parts of Donetsk Oblast (after the 2014 Russian invasion on August 24, all Ukrainian forces were withdrawn)
 Sector M – southern parts of Donetsk Oblast (around Mariupol, hence the sector's identification)

Influence in culture and society

Since 28 December 2015, the song "Brattia Ukraintsi" (Brothers Ukrainians) is the official anthem of ATO.

Further reading
 Surzhenko, M. ATO. Stories from East to West (АТО. Історії зі Сходу на Захід). "DISCURSUS" at Google Books. Brusturiv 2014 
 Sakwa, R. Frontline Ukraine: Crisis in the Borderlands. "I.B.Tauris" by Google Books. 2014

Notes

References

External links
 Official informational portal of the National Security and Defense Council of Ukraine
 ATO zone news from Segodnya
 ATO zone (documentary series) at 24 TV channel (Ukraine)
 ATO zone news from Korrespondent.net
 ATO zone at Новини України | Цензор.НЕТ - останні новини дня | Свіжі головні новини України та світу

Subdivisions of Ukraine
War in Donbas
Counterterrorism
Donbas
History of Donetsk Oblast
History of Luhansk Oblast